The Hundred Days Men was the nickname applied to a series of regiments of United States Volunteers raised in 1864 for 100-day service in the Union Army during the height of the American Civil War. These short-term, lightly trained troops freed veteran units from routine duty to allow them to go to the front lines for combat purposes.

Background
In the spring of 1864, the Governor of Ohio, John Brough, was concerned with preventing Confederate invasions of the North, as Brigadier General John Hunt Morgan's cavalry raid of Ohio had done during 1863. As the Civil War entered its fourth year, troops were increasingly difficult to raise both North and South. In the North, substantial bounties were offered to induce enlistment and the unpopular draft and substitute system was used to meet quotas.

Brough proposed to enlist the state militia into federal service for a period of 100 days to provide short-term troops that would serve as guards, laborers, and rear echelon soldiers to free more veteran units for combat duty.  This would increase the number of men in the Northern armies campaigning in the South and allowing the Union to achieve victory more quickly—hopefully in one hundred or fewer days.

Brough expanded the idea and contacted the governors of Indiana, Illinois, Iowa, Wisconsin, and New Jersey to do likewise to raise 100,000 men to offer the Lincoln Administration.  The governors of these five states submitted their suggestion to Secretary of War Edwin M. Stanton, who placed the proposal before President Abraham Lincoln.  Lincoln immediately approved the plan.

Formation and history
The War Department accepted all of Ohio's recruits, and the men were ready for duty within sixteen days of enlistment. Although other states brought in a total of around 25,000 men, only Ohio came close to its goal, federalizing close to 36,000 militiamen.  Even when the system later spread to other Northern states, a total of only about 81,000 men was raised for a 100-day period.

These veterans became known as Hundred Days Men.

100-day Regiments by State
-Illinois

Illinois raised thirteen regiments and two battalions with 100-day enlistments. Five of these regiments voluntarily extended their term of service.

132nd Illinois Infantry
133rd Illinois Infantry
134th Illinois Infantry
135th Illinois Infantry
136th Illinois Infantry
137th Illinois Infantry
138th Illinois Infantry
139th Illinois Infantry
140th Illinois Infantry
141st Illinois Infantry
142nd Illinois Infantry
143rd Illinois Infantry
145th Illinois Infantry
Alton Battalion

-Indiana
132nd Indiana Infantry
133rd Indiana Infantry
134th Indiana Infantry
135th Indiana Infantry
136th Indiana Infantry
137th Indiana Infantry
138th Indiana Infantry

-Iowa
44th Iowa Infantry
45th Iowa Infantry
46th Iowa Infantry
47th Iowa Infantry
48th Iowa Infantry Battalion

-Ohio
130th Ohio Infantry
131st Ohio Infantry
132nd Ohio Infantry
133rd Ohio Infantry
134th Ohio Infantry
135th Ohio Infantry
136th Ohio Infantry
137th Ohio Infantry
138th Ohio Infantry
139th Ohio Infantry
140th Ohio Infantry
141st Ohio Infantry
142nd Ohio Infantry
143rd Ohio Infantry
144th Ohio Infantry
145th Ohio Infantry
146th Ohio Infantry
147th Ohio Infantry
148th Ohio Infantry
149th Ohio Infantry
150th Ohio Infantry
151st Ohio Infantry
152nd Ohio Infantry
153rd Ohio Infantry
154th Ohio Infantry
155th Ohio Infantry
156th Ohio Infantry
157th Ohio Infantry
159th Ohio Infantry
160th Ohio Infantry
161st Ohio Infantry
162nd Ohio Infantry
163rd Ohio Infantry
164th Ohio Infantry
165th Ohio Infantry
166th Ohio Infantry
167th Ohio Infantry
168th Ohio Infantry
169th Ohio Infantry
170th Ohio Infantry
171st Ohio Infantry
172nd Ohio Infantry

-New Jersey
37th New Jersey Infantry

-Wisconsin
39th Wisconsin Infantry
40th Wisconsin Infantry
41st Wisconsin Infantry

See also
Illinois in the Civil War
Iowa in the Civil War
Ohio in the Civil War
New Jersey in the Civil War

References

S. M. Sherman, History of the 133rd Regiment, OVI and incidents connected with its Service During the War of the Rebellion, 1896.

Union Army
Ohio in the American Civil War
Volunteer units of the United States